Sampson Hill is a mountain in Dukes County, Massachusetts. Washaqua Hill is located southeast of Sampson Hill.

References

Mountains of Massachusetts
Mountains of Dukes County, Massachusetts